Liza Japaridze (born 19 September 2004), known professionally as Lizi Pop, is a Georgian singer, actress, model, dancer and television presenter. She represented Georgia in the Junior Eurovision Song Contest 2014 in Malta with the song "Happy Day" and co-hosted the Junior Eurovision Song Contest 2017 in Tbilisi with Helen Kalandadze.

Life and career

Early life
Liza Japaridze was born on 19 September 2004 in Tbilisi. She studies at the Georgian-American School. Japaridze speaks English, Russian and French, in addition to her native Georgian. Since 2011, she has studied vocals at the BzikebiStudio led by Giga Kukhianidze, whose songs represented Georgia at Junior Eurovision in 2008, 2010, 2011, 2012 and 2013.

Career

Japaridze released her debut single "Make-Up!" in 2012. She went on to release the singles "Cloud" and "Zgapari galagshi" as well, the latter of which was recorded with Candy, the winners of the Junior Eurovision Song Contest 2011. She had a starring role in the children's musical film Stapilo Story: Kurdgheli vs Mgeli.

In 2014, Japaridze was chosen to represent Georgia in the Junior Eurovision Song Contest 2014 in Malta, performing the song "Happy Day". Japaridze went on to place eleventh, the worst result for Georgia in Junior Eurovision. 'Happy Day', however, remained the most-watched video on the Junior Eurovision Song Contest channel for some years, before being overtaken by Roksana Węgiel's song Anyone I Want To Be. At Junior Eurovision, Japaridze performed with Sopho Dashniani, Dea Dashniani, Ketevan Arbolishvili, and Nita Lomidze as her backing vocalists and dancers. She was later announced as the Georgian spokesperson at the Junior Eurovision Song Contest 2015.

Japaridze hosted the Junior Eurovision Song Contest 2017 in Tbilisi alongside Helen Kalandadze. She is the second youngest ever to host the contest, only behind Ioana Ivan, who was only 12 when she hosted in 2006 and the first former participant to host the contest.

In 2021, she released a single called "Desire", composed by herself and Giga Kukhianidze.

Discography

Singles

References

External links

2003 births
21st-century actresses from Georgia (country)
Child singers from Georgia (country)
Female models from Georgia (country)
21st-century women singers from Georgia (country)
Junior Eurovision Song Contest entrants
Living people
Models from Tbilisi
Pop singers from Georgia (country)
Television presenters from Georgia (country)
Women television presenters from Georgia (country)
Musicians from Tbilisi